Leopoldo C. Jaucian, SVD, D.D. is a Roman Catholic Bishop of the Philippines and the Current Bishop of Bangued in Abra (Philippines) and yet he was the Former Chairman of the CBCP Episcopal Commission on Youth.

Biography 
Born on July 27, 1960 in Santa, Ilocos Sur (Philippines). The first child of Ernesto Ballesteros Jaucian, Sr. and Veronica Bello Corpuz has three brothers and three sisters. Having found themselves transferring from one place to another due to the work of his father, Monsignor Jaucian's family eventually settled in Urdaneta City, Pangasinan, where he came to know the Divine Word Society (SVD), which has a Secondary School Institution in this city - the Divine Word Academy of Urdaneta (now Divine Word College)

Monsignor Jaucian took his high school studies in this academy, after which, in 1976, he went to work as a sacristan at the SVD's Christ the King Seminary, in Quezon City. It was while having this work that he discovered his vocation to the priesthood, and expressed his intention to join the Divine Word Society.

As a full-fledged SVD seminarian and postulant he studied philosophy at the Christ the King Seminary from 1977 to 1979. Later, he underwent the Order's novitiate program in Tagaytay (1979 to 1981).

In 1982, after his novitiate, he was chosen to study Chinese language and culture. Thus, he was sent to Taiwan for the Oversea's Training Program, from 1982 to 1984. it was in Taipei where he finished his theological formation in 1987, at the Fu Jen Catholic University.

Ministry as a Priest 

Monsignor Jaucian was ordained to the priesthood, on 12 March 1988, at the Divine Word College Chapel in Urdaneta City, by Bishop Miguel Cinches, who is also a member of the Divine Word Society.

After Ordination, the new priest went back to Taiwan, where he worked as Assistant Pastor at the St. Joseph the Worker Parish in Chiayi for one year. He also served as a Campus Minister at the Fu Jen Catholic University for three years (1989-1992).

After his stint in Taiwan, Monsignor Jaucian returned to the Philippines in 1992. In Manila, he studied Guidance and Counselling at the De La Salle University. He was also assisting at the St. Jude Catholic Parish and Archdiocesan Shrine near the Malacañang Palace. In 1995, he finished his master's degree at the said University.

From 1995 to 2000, he was assigned at the St. Jude Catholic School, with responsibilities varying from being Campus Minister, Assistant Principal and Assistant Director. In 2000, he was appointed parish priest of the Shrine. Concurrently, he was also given the responsibility as the Superior of the SVD Manila District, and as Vicar Forane of the Vicariate of San Jose de Trozo of the Archdiocese of Manila.

In January 2005, he was elected as SVD's Provincial Superior for the Philippine Central Province.

Bishop of Bangued 
Pope Benedict XVI named Monsignor Leopoldo Jaucian as Bishop of the Diocese of Bangued, Abra, on 5 January 2007. He received his episcopal ordination, on 26 March of that year by His Eminence Gaudencio Cardinal Rosales, D.D., together with Bishop Artemio Rillera and Archbishop Fernando Filoni, and Installed on March 31, 2007

See also
Roman Catholic Diocese of Bangued
Roman Catholic Church in the Philippines
Divine Word Society
St. Jude Catholic School
National Shrine of Saint Jude Thaddeus

References

1960 births
Living people
21st-century Roman Catholic bishops in the Philippines
People from Ilocos Sur
People from Urdaneta, Pangasinan
Fu Jen Catholic University alumni
Academic staff of Fu Jen Catholic University